Stoyko Gochev (born 12 January 1965) is a Bulgarian gymnast. He competed in eight events at the 1988 Summer Olympics.

References

1965 births
Living people
Bulgarian male artistic gymnasts
Olympic gymnasts of Bulgaria
Gymnasts at the 1988 Summer Olympics
People from Chirpan